Said Assagaff is an Indonesian politician from the Maluku Islands. He served as the governor of Maluku province for the 2014–2019 term, have been elected to the office immediately after his tenure as the vice governor. Under his administration, efforts were taken to promote the province as a tourism hub.

References

Governors of Maluku
Indonesian Muslims
Living people
People from Maluku (province)
1953 births